Lou Spears (birth year unknown) is a retired NASCAR Grand National driver from Ardmore, Pennsylvania, US. He competed in a two-year career that spanned from 1955 to 1957. Spears scored one position in the top ten and finished the race in 20th place on average. His average starts were in 31st place and spent  in a stock car.

References

NASCAR drivers
People from Ardmore, Pennsylvania
Living people
Racing drivers from Pennsylvania
Year of birth missing (living people)